The News 12 Networks are a group of regional cable news television channels in the New York metropolitan area that are owned by Altice USA. All channels provide rolling news coverage 24 hours a day, focusing primarily on regions of the metro area outside Manhattan, Queens, and Staten Island.

History
The first of the channels, News 12 Long Island, was launched by Cablevision on December 15, 1986, to customers on its Long Island system, as the first 24-hour regional cable news service in the United States. Over the years Cablevision expanded the reach of News 12 by adding additional networks across its footprint.

The network was formerly operated by Newsday Media Holdings and presided over by Patrick Dolan, son of Newsday majority owner Charles Dolan and brother of James L. Dolan. Altice USA, who bought Cablevision in 2016, has retained Dolan as a senior network advisor.

In December 2005, News 12 Networks generated criticism when it changed its website and mobile app to a pay subscription service for those who live outside the News 12 viewing area. The News 12 website is offered free of charge to subscribers of Optimum, Spectrum or Xfinity. This has been used as a marketing tool against customers signing up for Verizon FiOS, or satellite providers DirecTV or Dish Network, which are available in many of the areas News 12 covers. At one point Cablevision even made the network's slogan, "Only on Cable. Never on FiOS. Never on satellite." (In some ads, FiOS was substituted with "phone company television" and in most areas, "Cable" was substituted with Cablevision in areas where Cablevision was only provided as a cable provider, notably Long Island). In response, Verizon FIOS partnered with RNN to create FiOS1 News in June 2009 and later expanded to the Lower Hudson Valley in 2014, which could be viewed only by FiOS customers. Unlike News 12, FiOS1's website was not behind the paywall and was open to all users, with the exception of its live broadcast (which was only offered to FiOS customers). 

In October 2016, newspaper reports stated News 12 was consolidating its Westchester and Connecticut News operations, moving news anchor desks and studio operations to New Jersey and Long Island, and news and production staff at these operations would be laid off. Reports indicated Westchester News Director Janine Rose was allowed to resign, and Connecticut News Director Tom Appleby was dismissed.

By August 2017, the seven News 12 Network cable channels began airing Cheddar's news summaries segments.

In April 2018, Altice announced that it would form a new division named Altice USA News (renamed to Altice News after Cheddar acquisition) that would consist of News 12 and I24NEWS. The division was headed by Michael Schreiber now succeeded by Jon Steinberg.

Altice has departed from Cablevision's long-standing policy of ensuring that News 12 remained exclusive to cable. In July 2019, Altice began to simulcast News 12 on Atlantic City station WACP between 6 AM and 9 AM every weekday morning. Beginning on November 4, 2019, Verizon FiOS began carrying News 12 and News 12+. They were meant to replace FiOS 1, which shut down 9 days later. Verizon later added sister networks i24News and Cheddar in early 2020.

Networks

Notable on-air staff

Former staff

Jodi Applegate (later at MSNBC, WNYW and WPIX)
John Bolaris (later at WCBS-TV, WTXF-TV and WCAU)
Patti Ann Browne (later at MSNBC and Fox News Channel)
Ted David (later at WINS Radio)
Lori Delgado (later at WCAU)
Ron Corning (later at WFAA in Dallas-Fort Worth)
Carolyn Gusoff (later at WCBS-TV/WLNY-TV)
Steve Kornacki (later at MSNBC and NBC News)
Bonnie Schneider (later at Weather Channel and Weather.com)
Lara Spencer (later with ABC News as co-anchor of Good Morning America)
Melba Tolliver (former reporter/anchor for WABC-TV and WNBC-TV.
Alicia Vitarelli (later at WPVI-TV in Philadelphia)
Bob Wolff - sports correspondent, Member - Baseball Hall of Fame (deceased)

References

External links

Official News 12 website

Altice USA
24-hour television news channels in the United States
Television stations in Connecticut
Mass media in New Jersey
Television stations in New York (state)
Television channels and stations established in 1986